Honda Miss Universe Nepal 2020,  the 1st ever annual Miss Universe Nepal beauty pageant, was held on 30 December 2020 at the newly built Kathmandu Marriott Hotel in Kathmandu. Nagma Shrestha (one of the winners of Miss Nepal 2017 who was designated by the Miss Nepal organisation after they received the official licence from the Miss Universe organisation and the first ever representative of Nepal in Miss Universe 2017 and national director of the Miss Universe Nepal organisation) crowned Anshika Sharma as Miss Universe Nepal to represent Nepal in Miss Universe 2020.

The winner of Miss Universe Nepal 2020 received NPR Rs. 1,000,000 as prize for winning the title as well as full support from the Miss Universe Nepal Organisation for her chosen advocacy.

AP1 TV  broadcast the pageant live and for all the Nepalese abroad. Miss Universe Nepal 2020 was also live streamed on Youtube.

Background

Location and date
The first ever edition of the Miss Universe Nepal beauty contest was scheduled to be held on 30 December 2021. The press conference of the contest was conducted at the Kathmandu Marriott Hotel in Kathmandu, in which the Kathmandu Marriott Hotel in Kathmandu will be served as the venue for the close camp and the grand finale coronation.

Hosts and Performer
Subeksha Khadka (Miss Nepal International 2012 and World Miss University Nepal 2017) was made the official spokesperson of Miss Universe Nepal by managing director Nagma Shrestha (Miss Nepal Earth 2012, Top 8 Finalist of Miss Earth 2012 and Nepal's first ever representative at Miss Universe 2017. Subeksha hosted everything from the Top 50 Announcement. As for the final, Rabi Rajkarnikar hosted the event with Subeksha Khadka.

Shashwot Khadka was the performer for the Final Look of the 18 participants of Miss Universe Nepal 2020.

Selection of Participants
Applications for Miss Universe Nepal started on 5 November and applications ended on 9 November. The official press presentation for Miss Universe Nepal 2021 was on 25 December 2020.

'The BBB (Brave, Bold and Beautiful) Crown'
A new crown will be used to award the winner of the Miss Universe Nepal pageant for the 2020 edition. The headwear is known as the "The BBB (Brave, Bold and Beautiful) Crown" and was crafted by Apala Jewels.

The crown is centered around three gems (Sapphire, Ruby and Diamond) that represent the all-inclusive platform and message of Miss Universe Nepal: Brave, Bold and Beautiful (BBB). The crown is worth NPR Rs. 1,500,000 (US $12,700).

Results 
Color keys

(●): The candidates won the Miss Popular Choice Award (online voting) and got direct entry into Top 10 Finalists.  <small>
(฿): The candidate won the Social Impact Leader Award (Best BBB (Brave, Bold and Beautiful) Social Advocacy) and got direct entry into Top 10 Finalists.

Special Awards

Miss Popular Choice 

The winner of the "Miss Popular Choice" was determined via a public paid voting on the Khalti app with the voting page for Miss Universe Nepal or using the Miss Universe Nepal app. Nancy Khadka from Biratnagar, Dikta Thapa from Chandragiri, Anshika Sharma from Sydney and Parichhya Bista from Dhulikhel automatically qualified for the top 10 finalists at the grand final round, held on 30 December in Hotel Marriott, Kathmandu.

Judges
The contestants selected their judges from the Top 10 Q&A round. The contestants selected their judge through the category of which judge they want to talk to. The theme was gemstones, the judges had their selected gemstone for judging (Sapphire, Ruby, Amethyst, Topaz, Emerald and Diamond).

 Malvika Subba (Diamond) - Winner of Miss Nepal 2002 and Nepali media personality. 
 Anupama Khunjeli (Ruby) - Chief Executive Officer of Mega Bank Nepal
 Usha Rajak (Sapphire) - Nepali Cinema (Kollywood) actress
 Prerana Shah (Topaz) - 1st Runner up of Miss Nepal 2003, Top 10 Finalist of Miss Asia Pacific International 2003 and international holistic health and transformation specialist.
 Charu Chadha (Emerald) - Chief Editor of Media 9 Nepal
 Abhaya Subba (Amethyst) - Nepali singer, songwriter and musician.

Contestants

Note

Previous Experience
 (#1) Rozina Shrestha won Miss Tourism World Nepal 2019.
 (#2) Surabhi Kanal was the winner of Miss Nepal USA 2019.
 (#3) Nina Kant Mandal was the winner of Miss Asia Russia 2018.
 (#4) Sujita Basnet was the winner of Miss Nepal USA 2011 and became the first ever winner of Miss Nepal USA. 
 (#5) Sujita Basnet was one of the winners of Miss Maryland World 2016.
 (#6) Sujita Basnet was one of the Top 12 semifinalists in Miss World America 2016.
 (#7) Anshika Sharma was 1st runner up in Miss Nepal Oceania 2020.
 (#8) Priya Sigdel was crowned as Miss Nepal Earth in Miss Nepal 2018.
 (#9) Priya Sigdel was one of the top 18 semifinalists in Miss Earth 2018.
 (#10) Jyoti Bhatta was 2nd runner up in Miss Nepal Europe 2020 representing Belgium.
 (#11) Roshni Khatri was 1st runner up in Miss Nepal 2016 and was crowned as Miss Nepal Earth for 2016.
 (#12) Roshni Khatri represented Nepal in Miss Earth 2016.
 (#13) Angel Lama competed for Nepal in Miss International Queen 2019.
 (#14) Paramita Rana was the 1st runner up in Face of Classic Diamond 2014.

References

External links
Miss Universe Nepal Website

Beauty pageants in Nepal
2020 beauty pageants
2020 in Nepal